St. Francis Secondary School was founded in 1949 at Makeni, Sierra Leone. The school was fondly called the "school of languages".

References

Educational institutions established in 1949
1949 establishments in Sierra Leone
Secondary schools in Sierra Leone
Makeni
Congregation of Christian Brothers secondary schools